Rima is the name of the following villages in Syria:

 Rima, Qatana
 Rima, Yabrud